Harisadhan Dasgupta (1923–1996) was an Indian film director from Calcutta who was most prolific in the 1950s and 1960s. Dasgupta specialized in surveying subjects of fascination to the Bengali public.

Dasgupta attended the University of Southern California and later the University of California, Los Angeles to study film-making. He studied for a time under Hollywood producer Irving Pichel. Upon completing an apprenticeship, he returned to Calcutta to produce documentaries.

Over a lengthy career, Dasgupta produced many documentaries, long and short. He was best known for his English language documentaries on the Bengali people's situation, including such works as Panchthupi: A Village in West Bengal (1955), Panorama of West Bengal (1961), Glimpses of India (1965), and The Automobile Industry in India (1969). He became most well known for his classic documentary commissioned by Tata Steel, India's largest private corporation, titled Tata: The Story of Steel. As with several of his films, this documentary was scripted by Satyajit Ray. Throughout his career, Dasgupta also worked with several other leading lights involved in Calcutta's film-making renaissance, including Hrishikesh Mukherjee, Claude Renoir, Jean Renoir, Ravi Shankar, Chidananda Dasgupta, and Asit Sen. In 1947, Dasgupta co-founded the Calcutta Film Society along with Satyajit Ray, Chidananda Dasgupta, RP Gupta, Bansi Chandragupta and others.

Dasgupta was involved in a highly publicized incident when his wife Sonali left their marriage and their six-year-old son for Italian film director Roberto Rossellini. Their son Raja later expressed relief when she passed due to their estrangement.

Filmography
"A Perfect Day" 
Panchthupi: A Village in West Bengal (1955)
Panorama of West Bengal (1961)
Glimpses of India (1965)
The Automobile Industry in India (1969)
Tata Iron and Steel

References

1923 births
1996 deaths
Bengali film directors
People associated with Santiniketan
Film directors from Kolkata
University of Southern California alumni
University of California, Los Angeles alumni
20th-century Indian film directors